Bunga may refer to
 Bunga mas, a tribute that was sent every three years to the King of Siam from its vassal states in the Malay Peninsula
 Bunga River, northeastern Nigeria
 Bunga bangkai, a common name in Indonesia for Amorphophallus titanum, the so-called "carrion flower". Bunga simply means flower in Indonesian and Malay.
 Bunga raya, the Malay name for Hibiscus rosa-sinensis, the national flower of Malaysia
 Bunga, or Botija, a Caribbean musical instrument of the aerophone type
 Bunga bunga, an erotic entertainment
 Bunga, one of the main characters from The Lion Guard, a spin-off of The Lion King.
 Bunga, Uttarakhand, a hill station in the state of Uttarakhand, India
 Bunga, an ethnic slur used in New Zealand for a person of colour, especially a Pacific Islander.